The 51st Baeksang Arts Awards ceremony was held at Kyung Hee University's Grand Peace Hall in Seoul on May 26, 2015. It was aired live on JTBC and was hosted by Shin Dong-yup, Kim Ah-joong and Joo Won. Organised by Ilgan Sports, it is South Korea's only awards ceremony which recognises excellence in both film and television.

Winners and nominees 
Winners are listed first and highlighted in boldface.
Nominees

Film

Television

Special awards

References

External links 
  
 

Baeksang
Baeksang
Baeksang Arts Awards
Baek
Baek
2010s in Seoul
2015 in South Korea